, also known as , is a lake in the municipality of Namsskogan in Trøndelag county, Norway.

See also
 List of lakes in Norway

References

Lakes of Trøndelag
Namsskogan